Euchromius cambridgei is a species of moth in the family Crambidae described by Philipp Christoph Zeller in 1867. It is found in France, Spain, Portugal, Italy, Croatia, Ukraine, the Canary Islands, Tunisia, Libya, Egypt, Sudan, Israel, Jordan, Saudi Arabia, Iran, Afghanistan and Pakistan.

The wingspan is about 17 mm. The forewings are dusty grey, sprinkled with brown scales and an ochreous-yellow transverse streak, internally edged with white. The hindwings are yellowish grey with a darker apex.

References

Moths described in 1867
Crambinae
Moths of Europe
Moths of Africa
Moths of Asia
Taxa named by Philipp Christoph Zeller